Nutashkuan (INAC) or Natashquan (CGNDB) (sometimes Natashquan 1) is a First Nations reserve in the Canadian province of Quebec, belonging to the Première Nation des Innus de Nutashkuan band.

The reserve should not be confused with the adjacent but distinct township of Natashquan just to the north and east.

The community is serviced by a nursing station, community radio station, municipal water and sewer system, fire station, and an aboriginal police force.

The site was mapped in 1684 by Louis Jolliet who called it Noutascoüan. It was subsequently spelled as Nontascouanne (1734), Natasquan (1831), Nataskwan (1844), Natashkwan (1846), Natosquan (1857), Nataskouan (1858), and taking its current form, Natashquan, circa 1895. This name, spelled Nutahkuant or Nutashkuan in the contemporary Innu language, is usually translated as "where the black bear is taken" or "where one hunts for bear."

History
Historically, the nomadic Innu lived on their hunting grounds of the interior during the winter and would move to the coast in the summer for salmon fishing and seal hunting. From as early as 1710, a trading post was established on the left (south) bank of the Natashquan River and later on the opposite bank to conduct fur trade with the indigenous. They gathered at the post during their annual migration and began to settle there permanently. The post was acquired by the Hudson's Bay Company in the middle of the 19th century, but abandoned circa 1914 due to lack of profitability.

In 1909, the first land survey was conducted for the creation of a reserve. In 1952, the first  of land were bought by the Government of Canada and transferred for the use by the Innu on 31 March 1953. The reserve was incrementally enlarged in 1954, 1970, and 1993.

Demographics
As of May 2022, the band counted 1,212 members, of which 1,095 persons lived on the reserve. In the 2021 Canadian census there were 228 private dwellings that are occupied by usual residents, out of a total of 234. The mother tongue of the residents is:
 English as first language: 0%
 French as first language: 1.83%
 Innu-aimun as first language: 97.56%
 Other indigenous languages: 0.61%

Population trend:
 Population in 1991: 598
 Population in 1996: 639
 Population in 2001: 761
 Population in 2006: 810 (2001 to 2006 population change: 6.4%)
 Population in 2011: 841 (2006 to 2011 population change: 3.8%)
 Population in 2016: 835 (2011 to 2016 population change: -0.7%)
 Population in 2021: 915 (2016 to 2021 population change: 9.6%)

Climate
Nutashkuan has a subarctic climate (Dfc), typical of communities along the Gulf of St. Lawrence. Summers are mild and rainy, with mild days and cool nights. Winters are cold with extremely heavy annual snowfall, averaging . Nutashkuan receives around 1,900 hours of sunshine per year.

Economy
Nutashkuan's economy is mostly based on arts and handicrafts, trapping, tourism, and some construction, transport, and commercial fishing. In all there are some 20 businesses on the reserve. The Band council owns a boat and holds a crab-fishing licence.

Local economic development is promoted by and the responsibility of the Corporation de développement économique de Natashquan.

Education
There is only one school on the reserve, École Uauitshitun, that provides pre-Kindergarten to Secondary grade 3.

See also
 List of Indian reserves in Quebec

References

External links
Conseil tribal Mamuitun – Nutashkuan
Indian and Northern Affairs Canada – Aboriginal Community profiles: Première Nation des Innus de Nutashkuan

Innu communities in Quebec
Communities in Côte-Nord
Hudson's Bay Company trading posts